Roger Olsson (born 30 January 1944) is a Swedish former ice hockey center and Olympian.

Olsson played all seven matches with Team Sweden at the 1968 Winter Olympics and scored one goal. He previously played for VIK Västerås HK and Frölunda HC in the Swedish Elite League.

References

1944 births
Ice hockey players at the 1968 Winter Olympics
Living people
Olympic ice hockey players of Sweden
Swedish ice hockey centres
Sportspeople from Västerås